Gravesend is a village on the North West Slopes of New South Wales, Australia. At the 2006 census, Gravesend and the surrounding area had a population of 276. The village is situated at an elevation of approximately 275 metres (904 feet).

History
The town grew from a fettler's camp established on Gravesend station with the coming of the railway around 1900. Gravesend Post Office opened on 1 February 1900. The old railway bridge across the Gwydir River was transported from England.

With closer settlement a village developed and was officially named Gravesend in 1909.  In the 1930s, Gravesend was the site of a research station breeding cactoblastis moths later released to eradicate a devastating prickly pear infestation.
The surrounding area is given to agriculture production with sheep and cattle breeding, and the local wheat crops being taken a large silo complex being based in the village.

Today, Gravesend is serviced by a public school with approximately 30 students, post office, hotel, recreation and rodeo ground, community centre, District Nurse, a park with play equipment and a general store. The Gwydir River provides excellent fishing, camping, picnic, swimming and recreation areas. The official opening of the Historical Society Museum was held on 16 August 2008.  An annual rodeo is held on the rodeo ground. The village also has a fishing club, sewing and quilting club, garden club, Pony Club and  playgroup.

References

External links
Gravesend Cemetery

Towns in New South Wales
Towns in New England (New South Wales)
Gwydir Shire